James E. Morgan (June 13, 1934 – September 29, 2019) was an American basketball player and race horse trainer. He played college basketball for the Louisville Cardinals and won a National Invitation Tournament (NIT) championship in 1956. Morgan was selected by the Syracuse Nationals in the 1957 NBA draft but never played in the National Basketball Association (NBA). He was a high school teacher and basketball coach in Ohio before he became a horse trainer in the mid-1960s. Morgan was one of Ohio's leading horse trainers over a 40-year career.

Basketball career
Born in Hyden, Kentucky, he attended Stivers High School in Dayton, Ohio, and led the team to a No. 1 state ranking in the early 1950s. Morgan opted to play for the Louisville Cardinals over offers from the Kentucky Wildcats and his hometown Dayton Flyers. He scored 1,105 points in four seasons played with the Cardinals. Morgan was selected by the Syracuse Nationals as the 15th overall pick in the 1957 NBA draft but opted to not sign with the team after they offered him a $5,000 contract. He was a social studies teacher and basketball coach at Stebbins High School in Riverside, Ohio, for nine seasons.

Race horse training career
Morgan resigned from Stebbins in 1966 so he could pursue a longtime dream and became a race horse trainer, which he had first become interested in when he worked as an usher at the Churchill Downs racetrack in 1953. Morgan was one of the most successful Thoroughbred trainers in the Midwest and won over 300 stakes races to make him the winningest stakes trainer in Ohio. His horses amassed 1,993 total wins and made earnings of $20.7 million from 1967 to 2008. Morgan served as president of the Ohio Horsemen's Benevolent and Protective Association, and a trustee in the Thoroughbred's Horsemen's Health Fund from 1998 until his death. Morgan died of a heart attack in Dayton, Ohio.

Honors
Morgan was inducted into the Louisville Cardinals Athletics Hall of Fame in 1981, the Stivers Athletic Hall of Fame in 2006, and the Ohio Basketball Hall of Fame in 2013. He had his No. 12 jersey honored by the Louisville Cardinals and it hangs in the rafters of Freedom Hall.

References

External links
College statistics

1934 births
2019 deaths
American horse trainers
American men's basketball coaches
American men's basketball players
Basketball players from Kentucky
Guards (basketball)
High school basketball coaches in Ohio
Louisville Cardinals men's basketball players
People from Hyden, Kentucky
Syracuse Nationals draft picks